2Rule is a Hungarian sports clothing brand.

Customers
2Rule is the official kit provider for the following sports teams in Europe, nowadays mainly in Hungary.

Football
 Osijek (From 2020-2021)
 Csákvári TK
 Diósgyőri VTK
 Puskás Akadémia FC
 Szombathelyi Haladás
 Tiszakécske FC
 Zalaegerszegi TE
 FK Miercurea Ciuc
 Marbäcks IF (away kit)

Handball
 Balatonfüredi KSE
 Ceglédi KKSE
 DVTK-Eger
 Veszprém KC

References

External links

Soccer Jerseys
Replica Jerseys

Hungarian brands
Sportswear brands
Sporting goods brands
Clothing companies of Hungary
Manufacturing companies of Hungary
Clothing companies established in 2018
Hungarian companies established in 2018